Biały Kościół may refer to the following places in Poland:
Biały Kościół, Lower Silesian Voivodeship (south-west Poland)
Biały Kościół, Lesser Poland Voivodeship (south Poland)